The Debajehmujig Storytellers, also Debahehmyjig Theatre Group, or informally Debaj, is a First Nations theatre group and multi-arts organization based in the Wiikwemkoong Unceded Territory on Manitoulin Island in Northern Ontario. Debaj is the longest running Indigenous theatre in North America.

History
Debajehmujig is from the Ojibwe (debaajimoojig) and Cree (tepācimūcik), both meaning "storytellers". Debajehmujig was founded by Shirley Cheechoo, Blake Debassige and colleagues in 1984 in M'Chigeeng First Nation (formerly known as West Bay) on Manitoulin Island. In 1989, the company moved to Wikwemikong Unceded Indian Reserve (Wiikwemkoong Unceded Territory). In addition to being located in Wiikwemkoong, the company operates the Debajehmujig Creation Centre in Manitowaning. The main stage is the open air stage in the ruins of the Holy Cross Mission in Wiikwemkoong. The company plays throughout Canada under its Outreach program. The company was established so that "Native youth be given the opportunity to see themselves and their lives reflected on the stage, in the characters, in the stories, in the experiences portrayed."

See also
 Holy Cross Church, Wikwemikong

Notable alumni

Shirley Cheechoo — founder, actor, playwright, artistic director, board member
Tomson Highway — playwright, actor, artistic director (1984/85)
Rene Highway — actor
Drew Hayden Taylor — actor, playwright

References

External links
Official website

Theatre companies in Ontario
First Nations theatre